Ash is a hamlet approximately  north of the village of Stourpaine, Dorset, England.

Ash was listed in the Domesday Book of 1086.

References

External links
 
 

Villages in Dorset